Gold Dust Gertie is a 1931 American Pre-Code musical comedy produced and released by Warner Brothers. It was originally completed as a full musical. Due to the backlash against musicals, however, all the songs were cut from the film in all release prints in the United States. The film was originally known as Red Hot Sinners, but was released as Gold Dust Gertie after the musical numbers had been cut. The film was based on the play The Wife of the Party by Len D. Hollister. The film stars Winnie Lightner, Ole Olsen, Chic Johnson and Claude Gillingwater.

Synopsis
Winnie Lightner plays the part of a gold digger who married men only to divorce them and collect alimony. She marries Ole Olsen in 1927, divorces him, and then marries his friend Chic Johnson and also divorces him. By 1930, both Olson and Johnson have remarried but they continue paying alimony to Lightner without the knowledge of their current wives. When Olson and Johnson are late with their payment, Lightner shows up at their work. Olson and Johnson work at a firm that designs women's sportwear. Olson and Johnson's boss, played by Claude Gillingwater, is very old fashioned and insists on designing women's bathing suits that are so modest that they end up resembling the models from twenty years ago. Because of this, the business is doing poorly and Olson and Johnson are low on cash at the moment. Lightner, seeing that she currently has no chance of collecting from her ex-husbands at the moment, decides to vamp their boss. Lightner eventually convinces Gillingwater to liberalize his views. Lightner designs a new modern bathing suit which ends up winning an award. Gillingwater falls in love with Lightner and proposes marriage. Lightner accepts but problems soon arise. As they are celebrating their engagement another ex-husband shows up and, taking pity on Gillingwater, he attempts to warn him. Furthermore, the minister who Gillingwater has chosen to officiate at their wedding knows all about Lightner's ex-husbands and her gold digging schemes.

Cast
Winnie Lightner as Gertrude 'Gertie' Dale
Ole Olsen as George Harlan
Chic Johnson as Elmer Guthrie
Dorothy Christy as Mabel Guthrie
Claude Gillingwater as John Aberdeen Arnold
Arthur Hoyt as Dr. Rodman Tate, the Minister
George Byron as Captain Osgood
Vivien Oakland as Lucille Harlan
Charley Grapewin as Nicholas Hautrey
Charles Judels as Monsieur Pestalozzi
Virginia Sale as Secretary Modelling Skimpy Bathing Suit

Preservation
Only the cut print released in the United States seems to have survived at the Library of Congress.,  The complete film was released intact in countries outside the United States where a backlash against musicals never occurred. It is unknown whether a copy of this full version still exists.

References

External links 
 
 

1931 films
Warner Bros. films
1930s English-language films
Films directed by Lloyd Bacon
American black-and-white films
American musical comedy films
1931 musical comedy films
1930s American films